Afsar Khan Zazai (born 10 August 1993) is an Afghan cricketer. Afsar is a right-handed wicket-keeper batsman who is known for his batting skills. He was one of the eleven cricketers to play in Afghanistan's first ever Test match, against India, in June 2018. He is the first Test cap for Afghanistan.

International career
He effected nine dismissals in six games at the Under-19 World Cup qualifiers in September 2009. He was just 16 when he was included in the Afghanistan squad for 2010 Under-19s World Cup in New Zealand. In 2012, he played second Under-19s World Cup in Australia.

He was just 18 when he made his first-class debut for Afghanistan in an Intercontinental Cup match in Sharjah. In second innings he scored unbeaten 84 in three wicket win over The Netherlands.

The Netherlands were favorites to win when they had reduced Afghanistan to 111 for 6 in their chase of 233 on the second day. But Zazai did not give up and along with Mohammad Nabi’s 25 and Samiullah Shenwari’s 20 not out took Afghanistan to second position on the points table behind Ireland.

Afsar added 76 with Nabi and an unbroken 46 for the eighth wicket with Shenwari. He hit 13 boundaries in his unbeaten innings of 84 from 156 deliveries. Though Nabi fell to Michael Swart with the score on 187, Shenwari supported Afsar as he carried Afghanistan to the target.

He made his One Day International debut for Afghanistan against the United Arab Emirates on 28 November 2014.

In March 2017, he scored his maiden first-class century, when Afghanistan faced Ireland in round five of the 2015–17 ICC Intercontinental Cup.

In September 2018, he was named in Kabul's squad in the first edition of the Afghanistan Premier League tournament.

In May 2018, he was named in Afghanistan's squad for their inaugural Test match, played against India. He made his Test debut for Afghanistan, against India, on 14 June 2018.

In September 2021, he was named as one of two travelling reserves in Afghanistan's squad for the 2021 ICC Men's T20 World Cup.

References

External links
 
 

1993 births
Living people
Cricketers from Kabul
Afghan cricketers
Afghanistan Test cricketers
Afghanistan One Day International cricketers
Afghanistan Twenty20 International cricketers
Cricketers at the 2015 Cricket World Cup
Band-e-Amir Dragons cricketers
Kabul Zwanan cricketers
Wicket-keepers